José "Pepe" Aicart Suis (born 17 October 1986 in Madrid) is a Spanish former professional footballer who played as a defensive midfielder.

External links

1986 births
Living people
Spanish footballers
Footballers from Madrid
Association football midfielders
Segunda División players
Segunda División B players
Tercera División players
Atlético Albacete players
Albacete Balompié players
Celta de Vigo B players
RC Celta de Vigo players
Pontevedra CF footballers
CF Gandía players
CD Leganés players
SD Huesca footballers
CD Toledo players